The Metropolitan Borough of Barnsley is a metropolitan borough in South Yorkshire, England; the main settlement is Barnsley and other notable towns include Penistone, Wombwell and Hoyland.

The borough is bisected by the M1 motorway; it is rural to the west, and largely urban/industrial to the east it is estimated that around 16% of the Borough is classed as Urban overall with this area being home to a vast majority of its residents. Additionally 68% of Barnsley's 32,863 hectares is green belt and 9% is national park land, the majority of which is west of the M1. In 2007 it was estimated that Barnsley had 224,600 residents, measured at the 2011 census as 231,221, nine tenths of whom live east of the M1.

The borough was formed under the Local Government Act 1972, by a merger of the County Borough of Barnsley with Cudworth, Darfield, Darton, Dearne, Dodworth, Hoyland Nether, Penistone, Royston, Wombwell and Worsbrough urban districts, along with Penistone Rural District, part of Hemsworth Rural District and part of Wortley Rural District, all in the West Riding of Yorkshire.

The borough forms part of both the Sheffield City Region and the Leeds City Region.

Politics

Elections to the council are held in three out of every four years, with one third of the 63 councillors being elected at each election. The council had been controlled by the Labour Party since the first election in 1973. As of the 2011 election the council is composed of the following councillors:-

Following the election in 2012 the council has 53 Labour, 5 Barnsley Independent Group and 5 Conservative councillors. The borough council elects the mayor every year. On the day of the election, a parade takes place in front of the town hall in honour of the new mayor.

Barnsley borough is represented by four MPs: Dan Jarvis for Barnsley Central (Labour), Miriam Cates for Penistone & Stocksbridge (Conservative), Stephanie Peacock for Barnsley East (Labour) and John Healey for Wentworth and Dearne CC (Labour).

Towns, wards and villages
Ardsley, Athersley
Barnsley, Barugh, Barugh-Green, Billingley, Birdwell, Bolton upon Dearne, Brierley
Cortonwood, Carlecotes, Carlton, Cawthorne, Cubley, Cudworth
Darfield, Darton, Dodworth, Dunford Bridge
Elsecar
Gawber, Gilroyd, Goldthorpe, Great Houghton, Grimethorpe
Haigh (half in Wakefield district), Hemingfield, High Hoyland, Higham, Honeywell, Hood Green, Hoyland, Hoylandswaine
Ingbirchworth
Jump
Kendray, Kexbrough, Kingstone
Little Houghton, Lundwood
Mapplewell, Millhouses, Millhouse Green, Monk Bretton
New Lodge
Old Town, Oxspring
Platts Common, Penistone, Pilley, Pogmoor
Royston, Redbrook 
Shafton, Silkstone, Silkstone Common, Smithies, Staincross, Stairfoot
Tankersley, Thurgoland, Thurlstone, Thurnscoe
Ward Green, Wilthorpe, Woolley Colliery, Wombwell, Wortley, Worsbrough

Education

There are over 100 schools and colleges in the borough. State education is managed by Barnsley Local Education Authority. There are 14 state-run secondary schools and around 80 primary schools. There was an independent school, Hope House School. Post-16 education is provided at Barnsley College and the sixth form of Penistone Grammar School. An adult education college, Northern College, is located at Wentworth Castle in Stainborough. The University of Huddersfield has a campus in Barnsley town centre.

Places of interest
Cannon Hall
Cannon Hall Farm
Elsecar Heritage Centre
Monk Bretton Priory
Barnsley Town Hall
Lowe Stand

Places of concern
Boulder Bridge

See also
 List of Mayors of Barnsley

References

External links
Barnsley Portal
Royston website

 
Local government districts in South Yorkshire
Metropolitan boroughs
Leeds City Region